Acantholycosa sterneri is a species of wolf spider found in Mongolia and southern Siberia.

The male of this spider is easily distinguished from congeners by its densely hairy first and second pair of legs.

References

Lycosidae
Arthropods of Mongolia
Spiders of Asia
Spiders described in 1993